Gunilla Forseth (born 7 June 1985) is a Norwegian football striker. She plays for Melhus, near Trondheim.

Forseth started her career at Leinstrand before transferring to Kattem, becoming the club's top scorer in 2005 and being nominated Young Player of the Year in the Toppserien.  When Kattem was relegated to division-1 at the end of 2005 Forseth transferred to Trondheims-Ørn.

After six seasons at Trondheims-Ørn, during which she played 126 matches and scored 22 goals, Forseth transferred back to Kattem at the start of 2012.

Forseth played one match for Norway in January 2006, a 2–1 defeat by China at the Four Nations Tournament.

References
Profile at club site
National team statistics

1985 births
Living people
Norwegian women's footballers
Norway women's international footballers
SK Trondheims-Ørn players
Toppserien players
Women's association football forwards